Malyye Kizeli is a rural locality (a village) in Klenovskoye Selsoviet, Bolshesosnovsky District, Perm Krai, Russia. The population was 80 as of 2010. There are 2 streets.

Geography 
Malyye Kizeli is located 29 km northwest of Bolshaya Sosnova (the district's administrative centre) by road. Klenovka is the nearest rural locality.

References 

Rural localities in Bolshesosnovsky District